In probability theory, Robbins' problem of optimal stopping, named after Herbert Robbins, is sometimes referred to as the fourth secretary problem or the problem of minimizing the expected rank with full information.  Its statement is as follows.

Let X1, ... , Xn be independent, identically distributed random variables, uniform on [0, 1]. We observe the Xk's sequentially and must stop on exactly one of them. No recall of preceding observations is permitted. What stopping rule minimizes the expected rank of the selected observation, and what is its corresponding value?

The general solution to this  full-information expected rank problem is unknown. The major difficulty is that the problem is fully history-dependent, that is, the optimal rule depends at every stage on all preceding values, and not only on simpler sufficient statistics of these. Only bounds are known for the limiting value v as n goes to infinity, namely 1.908 < v < 2.329. It is known that there is some room to improve the lower bound by further computations for a truncated 
version of the problem. It is still not known how to improve on the upper bound which stems from the subclass of memoryless threshold rules.

Importance
One of the motivations to study Robbins' problem is that with its solution all classical (four) secretary problems would be solved. But the major reason is to understand how to cope with full history dependence in a (deceptively easy-looking) problem.
On the Ester's Book International Conference in Israel (2006) Robbins' problem was accordingly named one of the four most important problems in the field of optimal stopping and sequential analysis.

History 

Herbert Robbins presented the above described problem at the International Conference on Search and Selection in Real Time in Amherst, 1990. He concluded his address with the words I should like to see this problem solved before I die. Scientists working in the field of optimal stopping have since called this problem Robbins' problem.

References
 
 "Minimizing the expected rank with full information", F. Thomas Bruss and Thomas S. Ferguson, Journal of Applied Probability Volume 30, #1 (1993), pp. 616–626
 Half-Prophets and Robbins' Problem of Minimizing the expected rank,  F. T. Bruss and T. S. Ferguson, Springer Lecture Notes in Statistics Volume 1 in honor of J.M. Gani, (1996), pp. 1–17
 "The secretary problem; minimizing the expected rank with i.i.d. random variables",  D. Assaf and E. Samuel-Cahn, Adv. Appl. Prob. Volume 28, (1996), pp. 828–852 Cat.Inist
 "What is known about Robbins' Problem?" F. Thomas Bruss, Journal of Applied Probability Volume 42, #1 (2005), pp. 108–120 Euclid
 "A continuous-time approach to Robbins' problem of minimizing the expected rank", F. Thomas Bruss and Yves Caoimhin Swan, Journal of Applied Probability Volume 46 #1, 1–18, (2009).

Stochastic optimization